A watch strap, watch band, watch bracelet or watch belt is a bracelet that straps a wrist watch onto the wrist. Watch straps may be made of leather, plastic, rubber, cloth, or metal, sometimes in combination. It can be regarded as a fashion item, serving both a utilitarian and decorative function. Some metal watch straps may be plated with, or even in rare cases made of, precious metals.

Watch straps may close with a buckle or a folding clasp. Expanding watch straps are designed to expand elastically, often by the use of metal springs in a segmented design, and may be slipped on like a bracelet. Attachment points for the strap to the watch are largely standardized, with a spring bar (a spring-loaded double-ended pin) used to anchor the watch strap to holes in a bracket that is integral to the watch case, allowing worn watch straps to be replaced or swapped with new straps for fashion purposes.

Metal watch straps are typically stainless steel.
The most common metal watch strap styles are the folded link, pushpin, and screw-in styles.

Both metal watch cases and watch straps incorporating metal parts can sometimes cause contact dermatitis in susceptible individuals. Special anti-allergy watch straps, like a NATO style watch strap, which shield the skin from exposure to metal parts, are available for sufferers of this type of dermatitis.

Specialist expanding watch straps exist for use with diving watches. The use of wet, or in some cases, dry suits require the strap to expand in order to accommodate the added material, which increases the circumference of the wrist. Many watch straps intended for diving watches have rippled or vented sections near the attachment points on the watch case to facilitate the required flexibility to strap the watch around the bare wrist or around wet or dry suits.

NATO Straps
NATO watch straps, also known as "NATO Straps", were developed by the UK Ministry of Defence (MoD) for wartime usage (DefStan 66-47). The colour of the nylon ribbon (20 mm wide) shall be to BS 4800 card number 3, reference 18B25, colour grey. It is a one piece strap slid through the spring bars of the watch case and then slid into the appropriate notch, and then folded back to secure excess strap and prevented from sticking out of the main watch strap portion.
As the style gained popularity since its introduction in 1973, military personnel began to customize their watch straps, incorporating the colours of their units, creating the colourful  regimental stripe patterns NATO straps are now often known for.

The strap has been used in James Bond movies.

The Zulu watch strap is a NATO watch strap variation generally using a thicker weave of fabric and more substantial metal hardware using rounded loops and an oval-shaped buckle and both are typically made of nylon.

Bund straps, Perlon straps, Marine Nationale straps, Zulu straps, OctoPod straps, and NATO straps go completely around the wrist, including behind the case.
Other wrist strap styles allow the back of the watch case to directly contact the skin.

Watch strap types

Clasps 

A folding clasp or deployant clasp or deployant buckle is a device used to close a watch strap.

Variations 
 Butterfly clasps have a symmetrical appearance

See also

 List of watch manufacturers
 Folding clasp

References

Watches
Jewellery
Fashion accessories
Leather goods